Kaique Rocha Lima (born 28 February 2001), known as Kaique Rocha or simply Kaique, is a Brazilian professional footballer who plays as a central defender for Athletico Paranaense.

Club career

Santos
Born in Taboão da Serra, São Paulo, Kaique joined Santos' youth setup in 2013 at the age of 12. On 22 March 2017, he signed his first professional contract after agreeing to a three-year deal.

On 9 November 2018, as Robson Bambu's contract was due to expire and Lucas Veríssimo and Luiz Felipe were both injured, Kaique was called up to the first team by manager Cuca.

Sampdoria
On 2 September 2019, Kaique signed a five-year contract with Serie A side Sampdoria, for a rumoured fee of €1.2 million; Santos also retained 15% of a future sale. After being initially assigned to the Primavera squad, he made his professional debut on 27 October 2020 by starting in a 1–0 Coppa Italia home win against Salernitana.

On 30 August 2021, Kaique returned to his home country after agreeing to a two-year loan deal with Internacional.

On 20 January 2023, Kaique's contract with Sampdoria was terminated by mutual consent.

Athletico Paranaense
On 3 February 2023, Kaique signed a four-year deal with Athletico Paranaense.

International career
On 7 March 2018, Kaique was called up to Brazil under-17s for two friendlies against England.

Career statistics

References

External links

2001 births
Living people
Footballers from São Paulo (state)
Brazilian footballers
Association football defenders
Campeonato Brasileiro Série A players
Santos FC players
Sport Club Internacional players
Club Athletico Paranaense players
U.C. Sampdoria players
Brazil youth international footballers
Brazilian expatriate footballers
Brazilian expatriate sportspeople in Italy
Expatriate footballers in Italy
People from Taboão da Serra